Bab Mareaa, is a village located in the Western Beqaa District of the Beqaa Governorate in Lebanon.

History

References

Bibliography

External links
Bab Mareaa, localiban

Populated places in Western Beqaa District